Mula (Mandarin: 木拉乡) is a township in Daocheng County, Garzê Tibetan Autonomous Prefecture, Sichuan, China. In 2010, Mula Township had a total population of 1,775: 910 males and 865 females: 461 aged under 14, 1,922 aged between 15 and 65 and 122 aged over 65.

References 

Township-level divisions of Sichuan
Populated places in the Garzê Tibetan Autonomous Prefecture